Refuge de l'Aigle is a refuge in the Alps in France.
It opened in 1910 and was renovated during the summer 2014, and therefore closed between September 2013 and August 2014.

Mountain huts in the Alps
Mountain huts in France